Hymenobacter chitinivorans  is a bacterium from the genus of Hymenobacter which has been isolated from soil from Crete in Greece.

References

Further reading

External links
Type strain of Hymenobacter chitinivorans at BacDive -  the Bacterial Diversity Metadatabase	

chitinivorans
Bacteria described in 2006